This article presents a list of major awards and honors won by American country music singer-songwriter Loretta Lynn.

Awards

1960s

1970s

1980s

1990s

2000s

2010s-present

Academy of Country Music Awards

|-
| 1969
| rowspan=3| Top Female Vocalist
| rowspan=5| Loretta Lynn
| 
|-
| 1970
| 
|-
| rowspan=7| 1971
| 
|-
| Top Television Personality
| 
|-
| Entertainer of the Year
| 
|-
| Song of the Year
| rowspan=2|"Lead Me On"
| 
|-
| rowspan=2| Single of the Year
| 
|-
| "One's on the Way"
| 
|-
| rowspan=2| Top Vocal Group
| rowspan=2| Conway Twitty & Loretta Lynn
| 
|-
| rowspan=3| 1972
| 
|-
| Entertainer of the Year
| rowspan=3| Loretta Lynn
| 
|-
| rowspan=2|Top Female Vocalist
| 
|-
| rowspan=4| 1973
| 
|-
| rowspan=2| Album of the Year
| Louisiana Woman, Mississippi Man
| 
|-
| Love Is the Foundation
| 
|-
| rowspan=2|Top Vocal Group
| rowspan=2|Conway Twitty & Loretta Lynn
| 
|-
| rowspan=4| 1974
| 
|-
| Album of the Year
| They Don't Make 'Em Like My Daddy
| 
|-
| Top Female Vocalist
| rowspan=4| Loretta Lynn
| 
|-
| rowspan=2| Entertainer of the Year
| 
|-
| rowspan=5| 1975
| 
|-
| Top Female Vocalist
| 
|-
| Top Vocal Group
| Conway Twitty & Loretta Lynn
| 
|-
| Song of the Year
| "When the Tingle Becomes a Chill"
| 
|-
| rowspan=2| Album of the Year
| Feelins' (with Conway Twitty)
| 
|-
| rowspan=6| 1976
| Somebody Somewhere
| 
|-
| Single of the Year
| rowspan=2| "Somebody Somewhere (Don't Know What He's Missin' Tonight)"
| 
|-
| Song of the Year
| 
|-
| Top Vocal Group
| Conway Twitty & Loretta Lynn
| 
|-
| Top Female Vocalist
| rowspan=4| Loretta Lynn
| 
|-
| rowspan=2|Entertainer of the Year
| 
|-
| rowspan=3| 1977
| 
|-
| Female Vocalist of the Year
| 
|-
| rowspan=2|Top Vocal Group
| rowspan=2|Conway Twitty & Loretta Lynn
| 
|-
| rowspan=4| 1978
| 
|-
| Single of the Year
| "Out of My Head and Back in My Bed"
| 
|-
| Female Vocalist of the Year
| rowspan=5|Loretta Lynn
| 
|-
| rowspan=2|Entertainer of the Year
| 
|-
| rowspan=3| 1979
| 
|-
| Artist of the Decade
| 
|-
| Female Vocalist of the Year
| 
|-
| 1980
| rowspan=2| Top Vocal Duet
| rowspan=2| Conway Twitty & Loretta Lynn
| 
|-
| 1981
| 
|-
| 1994
| Pioneer Award
| Loretta Lynn
| 
|-
| 2010
| Vocal Event of the Year (with Miranda Lambert and Sheryl Crow)
| "Coal Miner's Daughter"
| 
|-
| 2014
| Crystal Milestone Award
| rowspan=2| Loretta Lynn
| 
|-
| 2021
| Poet's Award
| 
|}

American Music Awards

|-
| rowspan="1" style="text-align:center;"|1975
| rowspan="2" style="text-align:left;"|Conway Twitty & Loretta Lynn
| Favorite Country Group
|
|-
| rowspan="2" style="text-align:center;"|1977
| Favorite Country Group
|
|-
| rowspan=2|Loretta Lynn
| rowspan=2|Favorite Country Female
| 
|-
| rowspan="2" style="text-align:center;"|1978
| 
|-
| Conway Twitty & Loretta Lynn
| Favorite Country Group
| 
|-
| rowspan="2" style="text-align:center;"|1985
| Loretta Lynn
| Award of Merit
| 
|}

Americana Music Honors & Awards

|-
| rowspan="3" style="text-align:center;"|2004
| rowspan="1" style="text-align:left;"|Loretta Lynn
| Artist of the Year
|
|-
| rowspan="1" style="text-align:left;"|Van Lear Rose
| Album of the Year
|
|-
| rowspan="1" style="text-align:left;"|"Portland, Oregon"
| Song of the Year
|
|-
| rowspan="1" style="text-align:left;"|2014
| rowspan="1" style="text-align:left;"|Loretta Lynn
| Lifetime Achievement Award for Songwriting
|
|}

Billboard Women in Music Awards

|-
| rowspan="1" style="text-align:left;"|2015
| rowspan="1" style="text-align:left;"|Loretta Lynn
| Legend Award
|
|}

Grammy Awards

|-
| rowspan="1" style="text-align:left;"|1966
| "Don't Come Home A-Drinkin' (With Lovin' on Your Mind)"
| Best Country & Western Vocal Performance, Female
|
|-
| rowspan="1" style="text-align:left;"|1971
| "After the Fire Is Gone" (with Conway Twitty)
| rowspan=2|Best Country Vocal Performance by a Duo or Group
| 
|-
| rowspan="2" style="text-align:left;"|1972
| Lead Me On (with Conway Twitty)
| 
|-
| "One's on the Way"
| Best Country Vocal Performance, Female
| 
|-
| rowspan="1" style="text-align:left;"|1973
|"Louisiana Woman, Mississippi Man" (with Conway Twitty)
|rowspan=2|Best Country Vocal Performance by a Duo or Group
| 
|-
| rowspan="2" style="text-align:left;"|1975
| "Feelins'" (with Conway Twitty)
| 
|-
| "The Pill"
| Best Country Vocal Performance, Female
| 
|-
| rowspan="1" style="text-align:left;"|1976
| "The Letter" (with Conway Twitty)
|rowspan=2|Best Country Vocal Performance by a Duo or Group
| 
|-
| rowspan="1" style="text-align:left;"|1977
| Dynamic Duo (with Conway Twitty)
| 
|-
|rowspan="1" style="text-align:left;"|1988
| "Honky Tonk Angels Medley" (with k.d. lang, Brenda Lee and Kitty Wells)
| rowspan=3| Best Country Vocal Collaboration
| 
|-
|rowspan="1" style="text-align:left;"|1994
| "Silver Threads and Golden Needles" (with Dolly Parton and Tammy Wynette)
| 
|-
|rowspan="5" style="text-align:left;"|2004
| rowspan=2|"Portland, Oregon" (with Jack White)
| 
|-
| rowspan=2| Best Country Song
| 
|-
| rowspan=2| "Miss Being Mrs."
| 
|-
| Best Female Country Vocal Performance
| 
|-
| Van Lear Rose
| Best Country Album
| 
|-
|rowspan="1" style="text-align:left;"|2010
| Loretta Lynn
| Lifetime Achievement Award
| 
|-
|rowspan="1" style="text-align:left;"|2016
| Full Circle
| Best Country Album
| 
|-
|rowspan="1" style="text-align:left;"|2018
| "Wouldn't It Be Great?"
| Best Country Solo Performance
| 
|}

References

Lynn, Loretta
Awards